The 2014 Daytona 500, the 56th running of the event, was held on February 23, 2014 at Daytona International Speedway in Daytona Beach, Florida. Dale Earnhardt Jr., driving for Hendrick Motorsports, won the race, making this his second Daytona 500 victory breaking a 55-race winless streak. Denny Hamlin finished 2nd, while Brad Keselowski, Jeff Gordon, and Jimmie Johnson rounded out the Top 5. This race had seven cautions and 42 lead changes among 18 different drivers. The top rookies of this race were polesitter Austin Dillon (9th), Alex Bowman (23rd), and Brian Scott (25th).

Background

Daytona International Speedway is one of six superspeedways to hold NASCAR races, the others being Michigan International Speedway, Auto Club Speedway, Indianapolis Motor Speedway, Pocono Raceway, and Talladega Superspeedway. The track's turns are banked at 31 degrees, while the front stretch, the location of the finish line, is banked at 18 degrees. Jimmie Johnson was the defending race winner.

In addition to NASCAR, the track also hosts races of ARCA, AMA Superbike, USCC, SCCA, and Motocross. The track's  infield includes the  Lake Lloyd, which has hosted powerboat racing. The speedway is owned and operated by International Speedway Corporation.

The track was built to host racing that was being held by NASCAR founder Bill France, Sr. at the former Daytona Beach Road Course and opened with the first Daytona 500 in 1959. The speedway has been renovated three times, with the infield renovated in 2004, and the track repaved in 1978 and 2010.

This was the 56th running of the Daytona 500, the most prestigious race in all of NASCAR. This race also saw the Sprint Cup Series debut of five drivers of the eight in the 2014 rookie class. It also marked Terry Labonte's 32nd and final start in the Daytona 500. His 32 starts in the race are second all-time to Dave Marcis and his 33 starts. This edition of the race turned out to be Marcos Ambrose’s final start in the Daytona 500.

Entry list
The entry list for the 2014 Daytona 500 was released on Friday, February 14, 2014 at 1:45 p.m. Eastern time. Forty-nine drivers were entered to qualify for the race.

Practice

First practice February 15

Second practice February 15

Qualifying

"This is awesome," Dillon said. "It is all for our guys, and this guy right here Danny Lawrence, (head engine builder at RCR), it is his birthday. So we got him a one-two start at Daytona! That is pretty awesome." "It's a tremendous amount of motivation for us and momentum for us," said Gil Martin, Dillon's crew chief. "I mean, because every day you drive onto our complex, you see Richard's '3' and you see the heritage of that 3 there, so to be able to be a part of this, it's a dream come true for me, and I know it is for everybody in our whole team and our whole organization because I've watched Austin come from being a little guy to where he's at today, and it's been an amazing journey to watch. And to be a part of it now, I'm looking forward to it. I think it's going to be a great run."

Qualifying results

Practice (post-qualifying)

Third practice February 19
During the session, Joey Logano and Matt Kenseth made contact, which sent rookie Parker Kligerman into the catchfence and caused his car to land on its roof. As a result, Logano, Kligerman, Menard and Ryan Truex had to switch to backup cars for the Budweiser Duels. Dave Blaney withdrew from the race after his team was unable to secure another car.

Kligerman stated that it was the first flip of his career, and that he "assumed it would be rougher. It was pretty soft. I was up in the fence floating along. Then it just slid over softly". Logano stated that Kenseth had "started making a move to go down" and that he "was making the run, and I was going to fill that hole. He started to come back up and I was there".

Budweiser Duels

Race One
Austin Dillon led the field to the green flag at 7:16 p.m., and after leading the first 14 laps, Dillon lost the lead to Dale Earnhardt Jr. on lap 15. Matt Kenseth took the lead on lap 29, and held the lead until lap 36, when he pitted and the lead was passed to Earnhardt Jr. once again. Earnhardt Jr. and Kasey Kahne each held the lead for a lap before Kenseth cycled back to the lead with 21 laps to go. On the last lap, Kevin Harvick pulled up alongside Matt Kenseth, while Kahne got to the inside, creating a three-wide photo finish in which Kenseth prevailed. Michael McDowell and Joe Nemechek failed to make the Daytona 500. Kenseth stated that he "was kind of embarrassed to walk in the garage" but felt that his race performance "builds confidence in all of us, makes us feel like you can go out and get the job done if everybody does their jobs and we do everything right". Harvick's car failed post-race inspection because his car exceeded the maximum split on the track bar. He was disqualified, but his speed in qualifying was enough to get him into the Daytona 500. Greg Zipadelli, the competitions director at Harvick's team – Stewart-Haas Racing – referred to the infraction as "an adjustment during the race and it was more than it should have been".

Race Two
Martin Truex Jr. led the field to the green flag at 8:40 p.m., and Brad Keselowski took the lead on lap 3. Keselowski held the race lead for the next portion of the race, holding it until his pit stop on lap 35, which handed the lead to Casey Mears. On his pit stop, Keselowski was deemed to have been speeding while exiting, and had to serve a pass-through penalty. Denny Hamlin took the lead with 22 laps to go, and maintained the race lead until the end of the race, winning under caution.

Coming through turn four on the final lap, Jimmie Johnson ran out of gas, got loose after being tapped in the left corner panel, overcorrected and hit the wall collecting Jamie McMurray in the process. Truex Jr. had no way to avoid the wreck and rear-ended McMurray. While slowing to avoid the wreck, Clint Bowyer got rear-ended by Ryan Truex, slid to the runoff area taking David Ragan with him. Bowyer flipped over in the air and landed on all four wheels with the only damage being a destroyed drive-train. Ragan and Michael Waltrip were also caught in the wreck and both hit the inside wall head-on. Carl Edwards was caught by McMurray, but sustained minimal damage. McMurray made contact with Johnson again as they continued on into the grass, destroying the front ends of their cars. Bobby Labonte and Terry Labonte, who were both 30 seconds behind the leader on the final lap, raced their way into the Daytona 500, at the expense of Eric McClure, Morgan Shepherd and Ryan Truex. Hamlin's team owner, Joe Gibbs, stated Hamlin had "worked extremely hard" for the result, and he thought his team was "all hungry when the year started".

Starting lineup

Practice (post-duel)

Fourth practice February 19

Fifth practice February 21

Final practice February 22

Race

First half

Start
Austin Dillon started on pole, but led only the first lap. On the next lap, Denny Hamlin took the lead from Dillon. On lap 11, Hamlin dropped back, letting Kurt Busch take the lead. The first caution came out on lap 23 when Kyle Larson spun in turn 2 after getting two flat tires. Paul Menard assumed the lead on the restart and led for five laps, before Hamlin passed him for the lead. Kyle Busch passed him a lap later for the lead.  On lap 31, Martin Truex Jr.'s engine blew up, bringing out the second caution a lap later.

Rain delay
While the field was under caution, it began to rain and by lap 39, the red flag was thrown with Kyle Busch leading the race. At 2:50 p.m. local time, a tornado warning was issued for the speedway area and the grandstands were evacuated. The red flag lasted for 6 hours and 22 minutes as track-drying was delayed due to ongoing rain showers; this would make it the longest rain delay in Daytona 500 history. The race restarted at 8:52 p.m. local time.

Restart
After the red flag was lifted, the race ran seven laps under caution while the Air Titan did a pass over pit road. After pit stops, the race restarted on lap 47, with Kyle Busch still leading. Busch and Kasey Kahne traded the lead over the next few laps, before both faded and the Team Penske Fords of Brad Keselowski and Joey Logano took the point and swapped the lead for several laps. Menard also led seven laps during this time. During green flag pit stops around lap 85, Trevor Bayne, Aric Almirola, A. J. Allmendinger, Justin Allgaier, Michael Waltrip and Danica Patrick briefly held the lead for a couple laps at a time due to different pit strategies. Also during the cycle, moisture at the exit of pit road from the heavy rain shower caused Kahne to spin out into the grass exiting pit road and Kyle Busch pulled an air hose out of his stall exiting pit road, resulting in a pass through penalty – despite these incidents, the race remained under green.

Second half

Halfway
When the pit stop cycle ended, Paul Menard was on point, where he stayed until lap 107, when Jimmie Johnson took the lead and held it for 9 laps, until Keselowski took it on lap 116. Five laps later, Johnson passed Keselowski back for the lead, and held it until another cycle of pit stops on lap 127. At the conclusion of this cycle, Dale Earnhardt Jr. assumed the lead on lap 131 for the first time. He held the lead for thirteen laps, until lap 144, when Carl Edwards passed him. A lap later, Earnhardt retook the lead from Edwards.

The "Big One"
On lap 145, the third caution came out for a crash on the front straightaway. It started when Kevin Harvick and Brian Scott made contact in the exit of turn 4, sending Scott into Almirola. Almirola shot across the track and collected several more cars including Patrick, Waltrip, Parker Kligerman, Paul Menard, David Gilliland, Josh Wise, Austin Dillon, Justin Allgaier, Kasey Kahne and Marcos Ambrose. Patrick took the worst hit, as her car got turned by Almirola and slammed the outside wall in the tri-oval in a part of the track that lacked a SAFER barrier; the section of wall where Patrick hit the wall would receive a SAFER barrier before the rain-shortened Coke Zero 400 that summer. Upon exiting her car, Patrick felt "upset because the car felt really good, it was the best car [she's] had all of Speedweeks" and that her car "could catch whoever and move around...and move forward". Waltrip was more forthright in his thoughts on the crash, stating he "was going to be fine" but that another car "cleaned our clock from behind".

Closing stages
Greg Biffle assumed the lead from Earnhardt Jr. on lap 151 after pit stops. He led the restart on lap 154, but Earnhardt Jr. quickly regained the lead for two laps, before Biffle repassed him. Biffle led for three more laps before Earnhardt Jr. repassed him on lap 159. On lap 162, the fourth caution came out for a crash in turn 4 at the back of the pack. It occurred when Kyle Larson spun in turn 4 from contact with Dillon, causing major damage to several more cars including Marcos Ambrose, Kahne, Annett, Jamie McMurray, Ryan Newman, Brian Scott, Brian Vickers and Casey Mears. Earnhardt Jr. continued to lead on the restart on lap 169. He led until lap 173, when Biffle again passed him for the lead. Biffle led for two laps before he was passed by Edwards for the lead. Edwards led three laps, before Earnhardt Jr. passed them back for a lap, before handing the lead back to Edwards for four more laps. Earnhardt Jr. gained the lead for the last time on lap 183.

Finish
On lap 184, the fifth caution flag came out when Bayne's car snapped loose and crashed into the outside wall on the back straightaway. When the race restarted on lap 188, Earnhardt Jr. moved in front of Johnson to secure the lead. On lap 194, the sixth caution came out for a crash in turn 3. It started when Austin Dillon turned Ryan Newman. Newman's car turned sideways and collected five more cars, including Allgaier, Scott, Kligerman, Terry Labonte, and Cole Whitt, and set up a two lap shootout for the last restart. Although close on fuel and with a piece of bear bond from Newman's car stuck to his grill, Earnhardt Jr. took off on the last restart, moving in front of Jeff Gordon. Over the course of the last lap, an intense battle for the runner-up spots unfolded between Gordon, Hamlin, Johnson and Keselowski. Heading through turn 4, Harvick tried to force himself between McMurray and Kyle Busch in turn 4, and a wreck ensued as Harvick was sent into the wall, collecting a number of other cars including McMurray, Busch, Edwards, and Reed Sorenson. While that was happening, Earnhardt Jr. held off Hamlin and took the caution and checkered flags to score his second Daytona 500 victory. Earnhardt Jr. stated that his car was "awesome" and after some help from Gordon on the restart, Earnhardt Jr. "just took care of it from there".

Race results

Race statistics
 Lead changes: 42 among different drivers
 Cautions/Laps: 7 for 39
 Red flags: 1 for 6 hours, 21 minutes and 40 seconds
 Time of race: 3 hours, 26 minutes and 29 seconds
 Average speed:

Media

Television
Since 2001, (except for 2002, 2004 and 2006) the Daytona 500 has been carried by Fox. The booth crew has remained the same since the beginning with longtime NASCAR lap-by-lap commentator Mike Joy, two-time Daytona 500 winning crew chief Larry McReynolds, and 1989 Daytona 500 winner Darrell Waltrip. This was the final 500 on Fox for Steve Byrnes, Krista Voda, and Jeff Hammond. Fox repeated the 2013 Daytona 500 during the rain delay, confusing many viewers. When Fox showed Jimmie Johnson's winning moment from the 2013 race, he received a large number of congratulatory tweets. He was unaware that Fox had repeated the previous year's race during the rain delay.

Radio
The 2014 Daytona 500 was broadcast on radio by the Motor Racing Network and simulcast on Sirius XM NASCAR Radio. MRN Radio has covered the Daytona 500 since 1970. Joe Moore and Barney Hall covered the race from the booth. Longtime turn announcer and prodigy of MRN co-founder Ken Squier Dave Moody was the lead turn announcer. He called the race when the field was racing through turns 1 & 2. Mike Bagley worked the backstretch for the Daytona 500. Jeff Striegle called the race when the field was racing through turns 3 & 4. On pit road, MRN was manned by lead pit reporter and NASCAR Hall of Fame executive director Winston Kelly. Alongside him were Steve Post, Woody Cain, and Pete Pistone.

Standings after the race

Drivers' Championship standings

Manufacturers' Championship standings

Note: Only the first sixteen positions are included for the driver standings.

See also
2014 Sprint Unlimited, held on February 15
2014 UNOH Battle at the Beach, held on February 18
2014 Budweiser Duels, held on February 20

References

Daytona 500
Daytona 500
Daytona 500
NASCAR races at Daytona International Speedway